Bulimulus nesioticus is a species of  tropical air-breathing land snail, a pulmonate gastropod mollusk in the subfamily Bulimulinae.

This species is endemic to Ecuador.  Its natural habitats are subtropical or tropical dry shrubland and subtropical or tropical dry lowland grassland. It is threatened by habitat loss.

References

Bulimulus
Endemic gastropods of the Galápagos Islands
Gastropods described in 1896
Taxonomy articles created by Polbot